Serbian is the standardized variety of the Serbo-Croatian language mainly used by Serbs. It is the official and national language of Serbia, one of the three official languages of Bosnia and Herzegovina and co-official in Montenegro and Kosovo.  It is a recognized minority language in Croatia, North Macedonia, Romania, Hungary, Slovakia, and the Czech Republic.

Standard Serbian is based on the most widespread dialect of Serbo-Croatian, Shtokavian (more specifically on the dialects of Šumadija-Vojvodina and Eastern Herzegovina), which is also the basis of standard Croatian, Bosnian, and Montenegrin varieties and therefore the Declaration on the Common Language of Croats, Bosniaks, Serbs, and Montenegrins was issued in 2017. The other dialect spoken by Serbs is Torlakian in southeastern Serbia, which is transitional to Macedonian and Bulgarian.

Serbian is practically the only European standard language whose speakers are fully functionally digraphic, using both Cyrillic and Latin alphabets. The Serbian Cyrillic alphabet was devised in 1814 by Serbian linguist Vuk Karadžić, who created it based on phonemic principles. The Latin alphabet used for Serbian was designed by the Croatian linguist Ljudevit Gaj in the 1830s based on the Czech system with a one-to-one grapheme-phoneme correlation between the Cyrillic and Latin orthographies, resulting in a parallel system.

Classification

Serbian is a standardized variety of Serbo-Croatian, a Slavic language (Indo-European), of the South Slavic subgroup. Other standardized forms of Serbo-Croatian are Bosnian, Croatian, and Montenegrin. "An examination of all the major 'levels' of language shows that BCS is clearly a single language with a single grammatical system." It has lower intelligibility with the Eastern South Slavic languages Bulgarian and Macedonian, than with Slovene (Slovene is part of the Western South Slavic subgroup, but there are still significant differences in vocabulary, grammar and pronunciation to the standardized forms of Serbo-Croatian, although it is closer to the Kajkavian and Chakavian dialects of Serbo-Croatian).

Geographic distribution
Figures of speakers according to countries:

 Serbia: 6,540,699 (official language)
 Bosnia and Herzegovina: 1,086,027 (co-official language)
 Germany: 568,240
 Austria: 350,000
 Montenegro: 265,890 (language in official use)
 Switzerland: 186,000
 United States: 172,874
 Sweden: 120,000
 Italy: 106,498
Kosovo: est. 70.000–100.000 (co-official language)
 Canada: 72,690
 Australia: 55,114
 Croatia: 52,879 (recognized minority language)
 Slovenia: 38,964 
 North Macedonia: 24,773 (recognized minority language)
 Romania: 22,518 (recognized minority language)

Status in Montenegro
Serbian was the official language of Montenegro until October 2007 when the new Constitution of Montenegro replaced the Constitution of 1992. Amid opposition from pro-Serbian parties, Montenegrin was made the sole official language of the country, and Serbian was given the status of a language in official use along with Bosnian, Albanian, and Croatian.

In the 2011 Montenegrin census, 42.88% declared Serbian to be their native language, while Montenegrin was declared by 36.97% of the population.

Differences between standard Serbian and standard Croatian and Bosnian

Writing system

Standard Serbian language uses both Cyrillic and Latin script. Serbian is a rare example of synchronic digraphia, a situation where all literate members of a society have two interchangeable writing systems available to them. Media and publishers typically select one alphabet or the other. In general, the alphabets are used interchangeably; except in the legal sphere, where Cyrillic is required, there is no context where one alphabet or another predominates.

Although Serbian language authorities have recognized the official status of both scripts in contemporary Standard Serbian for more than half of a century now, due to historical reasons, the Cyrillic script was made the official script of Serbia's administration by the 2006 Constitution.

The Latin script continues to be used in official contexts, although the government has indicated its desire to phase out this practice due to national sentiment. The Ministry of Culture believes that Cyrillic is the "identity script" of the Serbian nation.

However, the law does not regulate scripts in standard language, or standard language itself by any means, leaving the choice of script as a matter of personal preference and to the free will in all aspects of life (publishing, media, trade and commerce, etc.), except in government paperwork production and in official written communication with state officials, which have to be in Cyrillic.

Usage
To most Serbians, the Latin script tends to imply a cosmopolitan or neutral attitude, while Cyrillic appeals to a more traditional or vintage sensibility. 

In media, the public broadcaster, Radio Television of Serbia, predominantly uses the Cyrillic script whereas the privately run broadcasters, like RTV Pink, predominantly use the Latin script. Newspapers can be found in both scripts.

In the public sphere, with logos, outdoor signage and retail packaging, the Latin script predominates, although both scripts are commonly seen. The Serbian government has encouraged increasing the use of Cyrillic in these contexts. Larger signs, especially those put up by the government, will often feature both alphabets; if the sign has English on it, then usually only Cyrillic is used for the Serbian text.

A survey from 2014 showed that 47% of the Serbian population favors the Latin alphabet whereas 36% favors the Cyrillic one.

Latin script has become more and more popular in Serbia, as it is easier to input on phones and computers.

Alphabetic order

The sort order of the  alphabet:
 Cyrillic order called : А Б В Г Д Ђ Е Ж З И Ј К Л Љ М Н Њ О П Р С Т Ћ У Ф Х Ц Ч Џ Ш

The sort order of the  alphabet:
 Latin order called : A B C Č Ć D Dž Đ E F G H I J K L Lj M N Nj O P R S Š T U V Z Ž

Grammar 

Serbian is a highly inflected language, with grammatical morphology for nouns, pronouns and adjectives as well as verbs.

Nouns 
Serbian nouns are classified into three declensional types, denoted largely by their nominative case endings as "-a" type, "-i" and "-e" type. Into each of these declensional types may fall nouns of any of three genders: masculine, feminine or neuter. Each noun may be inflected to represent the noun's grammatical case, of which Serbian has seven:

 Nominative
 Genitive
 Dative
 Accusative
 Vocative
 Instrumental
 Locative

Nouns are further inflected to represent the noun's number, singular or plural.

Pronouns 
Pronouns, when used, are inflected along the same case and number morphology as nouns. Serbian is a pro-drop language, meaning that pronouns may be omitted from a sentence when their meaning is easily inferred from the text. In cases where pronouns may be dropped, they may also be used to add emphasis. For example:

Adjectives 
Adjectives in Serbian may be placed before or after the noun they modify, but must agree in number, gender and case with the modified noun.

Verbs
Serbian verbs are conjugated in four past forms—perfect, aorist, imperfect, and pluperfect—of which the last two have a very limited use (imperfect is still used in some dialects, but the majority of native Serbian speakers consider it archaic), one future tense (also known as the first future tense, as opposed to the second future tense or the future exact, which is considered a tense of the conditional mood by some contemporary linguists), and one present tense. These are the tenses of the indicative mood. Apart from the indicative mood, there is also the imperative mood. The conditional mood has two more tenses: the first conditional (commonly used in conditional clauses, both for possible and impossible conditional clauses) and the second conditional (without use in the spoken language—it should be used for impossible conditional clauses). Serbian has active and passive voice.

As for the non-finite verb forms, Serbian has one infinitive, two adjectival participles (the active and the passive), and two adverbial participles (the present and the past).

Vocabulary

Most Serbian words are of native Slavic lexical stock, tracing back to the Proto-Slavic language. There are many loanwords from different languages, reflecting cultural interaction throughout history. Notable loanwords were borrowed from Greek, Latin, Italian, Turkish, Hungarian, English, Russian, German, Czech and French.

Serbian literature

Serbian literature emerged in the Middle Ages, and included such works as Miroslavljevo jevanđelje (Miroslav's Gospel) in 1186 and Dušanov zakonik (Dušan's Code) in 1349. Little secular medieval literature has been preserved, but what there is shows that it was in accord with its time; for example, the Serbian Alexandride, a book about Alexander the Great, and a translation of Tristan and Iseult into Serbian. Although not belonging to the literature proper, the corpus of Serbian literacy in the 14th and 15th centuries contains numerous legal, commercial and administrative texts with marked presence of Serbian vernacular juxtaposed on the matrix of Serbian Church Slavonic.

By the beginning of the 14th century the Serbo-Croatian language, which was so rigorously proscribed by earlier local laws, becomes the dominant language of the Republic of Ragusa. However, despite her wealthy citizens speaking the Serbo-Croatian dialect of Dubrovnik in their family circles, they sent their children to Florentine schools to become perfectly fluent in Italian. Since the beginning of the 13th century, the entire official correspondence of Dubrovnik with states in the hinterland was conducted in Serbian.

In the mid-15th century, Serbia was conquered by the Ottoman Empire and for the next 400 years there was no opportunity for the creation of secular written literature. However, some of the greatest literary works in Serbian come from this time, in the form of oral literature, the most notable form being epic poetry. The epic poems were mainly written down in the 19th century, and preserved in oral tradition up to the 1950s, a few centuries or even a millennium longer than by most other "epic folks". Goethe and Jacob Grimm learned Serbian in order to read Serbian epic poetry in the original. By the end of the 18th century, the written literature had become estranged from the spoken language. In the second half of the 18th century, the new language appeared, called Slavonic-Serbian. This artificial idiom superseded the works of poets and historians like Gavrilo Stefanović Venclović, who wrote in essentially modern Serbian in the 1720s. These vernacular compositions have remained cloistered from the general public and received due attention only with the advent of modern literary historians and writers like Milorad Pavić. In the early 19th century, Vuk Stefanović Karadžić promoted the spoken language of the people as a literary norm.

Dialects

The dialects of Serbo-Croatian, regarded Serbian (traditionally spoken in Serbia), include:

 Šumadija–Vojvodina (Ekavian, Neo-Shtokavian): central and northern Serbia
 Eastern Herzegovinian (Ijekavian, Neo-Shtokavian): southwestern Serbia, western half of Montenegro, Bosnia and Herzegovina, Croatia
 Kosovo–Resava (Ekavian, Old-Shtokavian): eastern central Serbia, central Kosovo
 Smederevo–Vršac (Ekavian, Old-Shtokavian): east-central Serbia
 Prizren–Timok (transitional Torlakian): southeastern Serbia, southern Kosovo
 Zeta–Raška (Ijekavian, Old-Shtokavian): eastern half of Montenegro, southwestern Serbia

Dictionaries

Vuk Karadžić's Srpski rječnik, first published in 1818, is the earliest dictionary of modern literary Serbian. The Rječnik hrvatskoga ili srpskoga jezika (I–XXIII), published by the Yugoslav Academy of Sciences and Arts from 1880 to 1976, is the only general historical dictionary of Serbo-Croatian. Its first editor was Đuro Daničić, followed by Pero Budmani and the famous Vukovian Tomislav Maretić. The sources of this dictionary are, especially in the first volumes, mainly Štokavian. There are older, pre-standard dictionaries, such as the 1791 German–Serbian dictionary or 15th century Arabic-Persian-Greek-Serbian Conversation Textbook.

Standard dictionaries
Dictionary of Serbo-Croatian Literary and Vernacular Language is the biggest dictionary of Serbian (and Serbo-Croatian as a whole) and still unfinished. Starting in 1959, 21 volumes were published as of 2020 and about 40 are expected by the time it is finished.
 Dictionary of Serbo-Croatian Literary Language in six volumes in 1967-1976, started as a common project of Matica srpska (published in Cyrillic) and Matica hrvatska (published in Latin). Only the first three volumes were published by Matica hrvatska due to negative feedback from Croatian linguists. 
 Dictionary of the Serbian language in one volume, published in 2007 by Matica srpska, which on more than 1500 pages in A4 format explains more than 85,000 entries.

Etymological dictionaries
The standard and the only completed etymological dictionary of Serbian is the "Skok", written by the Croatian linguist Petar Skok: Etimologijski rječnik hrvatskoga ili srpskoga jezika ("Etymological Dictionary of Croatian or Serbian"). I-IV. Zagreb 1971–1974.

There is also a new monumental Etimološki rečnik srpskog jezika (Etymological Dictionary of Serbian). So far, two volumes have been published: I (with words on A-), and II (Ba-Bd).

There are specialized etymological dictionaries for German, Italian, Croatian, Turkish, Greek, Hungarian, Russian, English and other loanwords (cf. chapter word origin).

Dialectal dictionaries
Kosovsko-resavski dialect dictionaries:
Gliša Elezović, Rečnik kosovsko-metohiskog dijalekta I-II. 1932/1935.
Prizren-Timok (Torlakian) dialect dictionaries:
Brana Mitrović, Rečnik leskovačkog govora. Leskovac 1984.
Nikola Živković, Rečnik pirotskog govora. Pirot, 1987.
Miodrag Marković, Rečnik crnorečkog govora I-II. 1986/1993.
Jakša Dinić, Rečnik timočkog govora I-III.1988–1992.
Jakša Dinić, Timocki dijalekatski recnik, (Institut za srpski jezik, Monografije 4) Beograd 2008, 
Momčilo Zlatanović, Rečnik govora južne Srbije. Vranje, 1998, 1–491.
East-Herzegovinian dialect dictionaries:
Milija Stanić, Uskočki rečnik I–II. Beograd 1990/1991.
Miloš Vujičić, Rečnik govora Prošćenja kod Mojkovca. Podgorica, 1995.
Srđan Musić, Romanizmi u severozapadnoj Boki Kotorskoj. 1972.
Svetozar Gagović, Iz leksike Pive. Beograd 2004.
Zeta-Pešter dialect:
Rada Stijović, Iz leksike Vasojevića. 1990.
Drago ĆupićŽeljko Ćupić, Rečnik govora Zagarača. 1997.
Vesna Lipovac-Radulović, Romanizmi u Crnoj Gorijugoistočni dio Boke Kotorske. CetinjeTitograd, 1981.
Vesna Lipovac-Radulović, Romanizmi u Budvi i Paštrovićima. Novi Sad 1997.
Others:
Rečnik srpskih govora Vojvodine. Novi Sad.
Mile Tomić, Rečnik radimskog govoradijaspora, Rumunija. 1989.

Sample text 
Article 1 of the Universal Declaration of Human Rights in Serbian, written in the Cyrillic script:

Сва људска бића рађају се слободна и једнака у достојанству и правима. Она су обдарена разумом и свешћу и треба једни према другима да поступају у духу братства.

Article 1 of the Universal Declaration of Human Rights in Serbian, written in the Latin alphabet:

Sva ljudska bića rađaju se slobodna i jednaka u dostojanstvu i pravima. Ona su obdarena razumom i svešću i treba jedni prema drugima da postupaju u duhu bratstva.

Article 1 of the Universal Declaration of Human Rights in English:

All human beings are born free and equal in dignity and rights. They are endowed with reason and conscience and should act towards one another in a spirit of brotherhood.

See also

Declaration on the Common Language 2017
Dialects of Serbo-Croatian
Mutual intelligibility
Pluricentric Serbo-Croatian language
Romano-Serbian language (mix with Romany)
Šatrovački (slang form)
Serbian language in Croatia
Serbian proverbs
Language secessionism in Serbo-Croatian

Explanatory notes

References

Further reading

Books

Journals

External links

 Swadesh list of basic vocabulary words (from Wiktionary's Appendix:Swadesh lists)
 Standard language as an instrument of culture and the product of national historyan article by linguist Pavle Ivić at Project Rastko
 A Basic Serbian Phrasebook 

 
Languages of Bosnia and Herzegovina
Languages of Croatia
Languages of Hungary
Languages of Kosovo
Languages of Montenegro
Languages of North Macedonia
Languages of Romania
Languages of Serbia
Languages of Slovenia
Languages of Vojvodina
Subject–verb–object languages
Slavic languages written in Latin script
Languages written in Cyrillic script